Lapp or LAPP may refer to:

 a dated and controversial term for the Sámi people

People

 Bernice Lapp (1917–2010), American Olympic swimmer
 Daniel Lapp, Canadian folk musician
 Henry Lapp (1862–1904), American carpenter-cabinetmaker
 Jack Lapp (1884–1920), American professional baseball player
 Katherine Lapp, administrator of Harvard University
 Ralph Lapp (c. 1910–2004), American physicist

Other
 Light art performance photography, a technique in  photography emphasizing landscapes, scenery and objects with light. It's a symbiotic art between a performance with light and a shutter that's open for a long time
 The Laboratoire d'Annecy-le-Vieux de physique des particules, a French experimental physics laboratory located in Annecy-le-Vieux in the Savoie region of France
 LAPP software stack, a variation on the LAMP software stack which uses PostgreSQL rather than MySQL/MariaDB

See also

 Lappland (disambiguation)
 
 
 
 
 Lap (disambiguation)
 llap (disambiguation)
 IAPP (disambiguation)